Chromosome 14 is one of the 23 pairs of chromosomes in humans. People normally have two copies of this chromosome. Chromosome 14 spans about 101 million base pairs (the building material of DNA) and represents between 3 and 3.5% of the total DNA in cells.

The centromere of chromosome 14 is positioned approximately at position 17.2 Mbp.

Genes

Number of genes 
The following are some of the gene count estimates of human chromosome 14. Because researchers use different approaches to genome annotation their predictions of the number of genes on each chromosome varies (for technical details, see gene prediction). Among various projects, the collaborative consensus coding sequence project (CCDS) takes an extremely conservative strategy. So CCDS's gene number prediction represents a lower bound on the total number of human protein-coding genes.

Gene list 

The following is a partial list of genes on human chromosome 14. For complete list, see the link in the infobox on the right.

Diseases and disorders
The following diseases are some of those related to genes on chromosome 14:

 Alzheimer disease
 Burkitt's lymphoma (t8;14)
 congenital hypothyroidism
 dopamine-responsive dystonia
 Follicular lymphoma (t14;18)
 FOXG1 Syndrome
 Hypertrophic cardiomyopathy
 Krabbe disease
 Cranio-lenticulo-sutural dysplasia
 Machado-Joseph disease
 Mosaic monosomy 14
 Multiple myeloma
 Niemann-Pick disease
 Nonsyndromic deafness
 Sensenbrenner syndrome
 Tetrahydrobiopterin deficiency
 Uniparental disomy (UPD) 14

Cytogenetic band

References

External links

 
 

Chromosomes (human)